The Paraplane GE-2 Golden Eagle is an American powered parachute that was designed and produced by Paraplane International of Medford, New Jersey. Now out of production, when it was available the aircraft was supplied as a kit for amateur construction.

Design and development
The aircraft was designed to comply with the US FAR 103 Ultralight Vehicles exemption rules for two-seat trainers as well as Experimental - Amateur-built rules. It features a  parachute-style wing, two-seats-in-tandem accommodation with a cockpit fairing, tricycle landing gear and a single  Hirth 2706 engine in pusher configuration.

The aircraft carriage is built from bolted aluminium tubing. In flight steering is accomplished via a unique patented weigh-shift steering system. On the ground the aircraft has nosewheel steering. The main landing gear incorporates spring tube suspension.

The manufacturer estimates the construction time from the supplied kit as 40 hours.

Operational history
In April 2015 no examples were registered in the United States with the Federal Aviation Administration, although one had been registered at one time.

Specifications (GE-2 Golden Eagle)

References

GE-2
1990s United States sport aircraft
1990s United States ultralight aircraft
Single-engined pusher aircraft
Powered parachutes